Hello Destiny... is the sixth album by American punk rock/ska punk band Goldfinger.

Background
In January 2007, Goldfinger were finishing up their new album, which they were expecting to release in mid-2007.

Release
On April 30, 2007, "Free Kevin Kjonaas" was posted on the band's Myspace profile. Following this, they appeared at the Wakestock festival in Canada. On December 22, 2007, Hello Destiny...  was announced for release in four months' time. On January 2, 2008, a track titled "One More Time" was posted on the band's Myspace profile. On March 10, 2008, the album's artwork and track listing was posted online. Ten days later, "Give Up" was posted on their Myspace. In early April, the band appeared at the Bamboozle Left festival. Hello Destiny... was made available for streaming on April 15, 2008, before being released on April 22, 2008 through SideOneDummy Records. "One More Time" was released to radio on the same day. In April and May 2008, the band went on a brief West Coast tour. Between mid-June and early August, the band toured with Less Than Jake on their Sleep It Off Tour in the US. In February and March 2009, the band toured Australia as part of the Soundwave festival.

Track listing
All songs are written by John Feldmann,  except where noted.

Personnel
John Feldmann – rhythm guitar, lead vocals
 Charlie Paulson – lead guitar
Kelly LeMieux – bass
Darrin Pfeiffer – drums

Additional personnel
 Matt Appleton - keyboards, horns

References

Goldfinger (band) albums
2008 albums
SideOneDummy Records albums
Albums produced by John Feldmann